Stephen Scott (born March 13, 1969)  is an American jazz pianist.  Scott played piano from the age of five. While attending New York’s High School of the Performing Arts he was introduced to jazz by alto saxophonist Justin Robinson, in particular the music of Wynton Kelly and Red Garland. Later, he took private lessons at the Juilliard School of Music.

In 1986 he received the Young Talent Award from the National Association of Jazz Educators and within the year was hired as accompanist to Betty Carter. Scott was soon playing with bands led by Kenny Barron, Terence Blanchard, Ron Carter, Lou Donaldson, Benny Golson, Craig Handy, Roy Hargrove, the Harper Brothers, Joe Henderson (appearing on the Grammy-winning tribute to Billy Strayhorn, Lush Life), Jon Hendricks, Bobby Hutcherson, Victor Lewis, appearing on Eeeyyess!, Branford Marsalis, Wynton Marsalis, Sonny Rollins and Bobby Watson.

Discography

As leader
 Something to Consider (Verve, 1991)
 Aminah's Dream (Verve, 1993)
 Renaissance (Verve, 1994)
 Beautiful Thing (Verve, 1996)
 Vision Quest (Enja, 1999)

As sideman
With Betty Carter
 Look What I Got! (1988)

With Ron Carter
 Eight Plus (Victor (Japan), 1990)
 The Bass and I (Somethin' Else, 1997)
 Orfeu (Somethin' Else, 1999)
 When Skies Are Grey... (Somethin' Else, 2001)
 Dear Miles (Somethin' Else, 2007)
 Jazz & Bossa (Blue Note, 2008)

With Ray Drummond
 1-2-3-4 (Arabesque, 1999)

With Frank Foster
 Leo Rising (Arabesque, 1997)

With Joe Henderson
 Lush Life: The Music of Billy Strayhorn (1991)

With Freddie Hubbard
 MMTC: Monk, Miles, Trane & Cannon (Music Master, 1995)

With Sonny Rollins
 Sonny Rollins + 3 (Milestone, 1995)
 Global Warming (Milestone, 1998)
 This Is What I Do (Milestone, 2000)
 Without a Song: The 9/11 Concert (Milestone, 2001)

References

1969 births
Living people
20th-century American pianists
20th-century American male musicians
21st-century American pianists
21st-century American male musicians
African-American jazz musicians
African-American jazz pianists
American male pianists
Enja Records artists
Verve Records artists
American male jazz musicians
20th-century African-American musicians
21st-century African-American musicians